HMS Unity was a British hoy launched in 1728 and sold in 1788.

Unity was the first prize taken by a vessel of the United States Navy.

Captured ships
1720s ships